William Wade was a Scottish Episcopalian priest.

Wade was born in 1784.  He was the incumbent at Paisley from 1817; and Dean of Glasgow and Galloway from 1843 until his death on 4 December 1845.

References

Scottish Episcopalian priests
Deans of Glasgow and Galloway
1784 births
1845 deaths